Slige Midluachra is the old northern road sometimes known High Kings Road that ran in ancient times from the Tara to Dunseverick on the north coast of Ireland.

It was one of the legendary Five Roads of Tara, site of the ancient Seat of  Ireland's High Kings. The legendary Five Roads of Tara, described in the  Dindshenchas of Slige Dala, are named Slige Dala, Slige Assail, Slige Midluachra, Slige Cualann, and Slige Mor.

General road routes are described in the  Dindshenchas, with mention of a few reference locations along each road. Three other ancient roads, referred to as "cow" roads, were found in  Lady Gregory's Irish Myths and Legends.  Lady Gregory relates the legend of how  Manannan's three cows (one white, one red, and one black) created the first three roads in Ireland.

Route

Slige Midluachra originated at Tara, crossing the Boyne at Slane, passing through Moyry Pass and then around the base of Slieve Fuaid  (near modern Newtownhamilton) to Emain Macha, and then on to Dunseverick on the north coast of Antrim:

References
 An Analysis of Pre-Christian Ireland Using Mythology and A GIS

Irish legends
Historic trails and roads in Ireland